The  2019 Champions Indoor Football season was the fifth season of the CIF. The regular season began on March 23 when the Salina Liberty traveled to the Amarillo Venom. The regular season concluded on June 22. Two teams per conference advanced to the Champions Bowl playoffs, with the top seed in each conference hosting their conference's second seed in the first round.

League changes 

During the 2018 season, it was announced that after a change in ownership, the West Michigan Ironmen would return to the CIF after playing a season in the semi-professional Midwest Professional Indoor Football. The league also added an expansion team called the Oklahoma Flying Aces in Enid, Oklahoma. During the offseason, the CIF lost the Bismarck Bucks and Quad City Steamwheelers to the IFL. When the 2019 schedule was released, both the West Michigan Ironmen and the Kansas City Phantoms had been removed as members. On May 9, the Texas Revolution folded during the season.

Standings 

 z - clinched top overall seed
 x - clinched conference title
 y - clinched playoff berth

References 

Champions Indoor Football seasons